Marcos César Vizolli (born 26 March 1965), sometimes known as just Vizolli, is a Brazilian football manager and former player who played as a midfielder. He is the current assistant manager of São Paulo.

Playing career
Born in São Paulo, Vizolli joined São Paulo FC's youth setup in 1978, and first appeared in the main squad in 1984. After failing to establish himself as a regular starter, he was loaned to Paulista in 1986, for the Campeonato Paulista.

Vizolli returned to Tricolor in 1987, but was again loaned in 1988, to XV de Piracicaba and then Japan's Yomiuri FC. He returned in the following year, and then became a regular starter before leaving for Xanthi in 1991.

Vizolli returned to Brazil in 1992 to play for Marília. He subsequently represented Juventus-SP, Paysandu and São José-SP before retiring in 1995.

Managerial career
Vizolli returned to São Paulo in 1997, to work in the club's youth categories. He was also the manager of the B-team in the 2004 season before leaving the club in 2009.

Vizolli rejoined São Paulo in 2016, managing in the club's under-20 and under-23 sides. On 27 December 2019, he was named permanent assistant manager of the first team.

On 1 February 2021, Vizolli was named interim manager of São Paulo for the remainder of the season, in the place of sacked Fernando Diniz.

Managerial statistics

Honours

Player
São Paulo
Campeonato Brasileiro Série A: 1986, 1991
Campeonato Paulista: 1985, 1987, 1989

References

External links

1965 births
Living people
Footballers from São Paulo
Brazilian footballers
Association football midfielders
Campeonato Brasileiro Série A players
São Paulo FC players
Paulista Futebol Clube players
Esporte Clube XV de Novembro (Piracicaba) players
Marília Atlético Clube players
Clube Atlético Juventus players
São José Esporte Clube players
Tokyo Verdy players
Xanthi F.C. players
Brazilian expatriate footballers
Brazilian expatriate sportspeople in Japan
Brazilian expatriate sportspeople in Greece
Expatriate footballers in Japan
Expatriate footballers in Greece
Brazilian football managers
São Paulo FC managers
São Paulo FC non-playing staff